Kosh Ba Kosh (Russian: Кош-ба-кош), also known as Odd and Even, is a 1993 Russian-Tajik film directed by Bakhtyar Khudojnazarov.

Plot summary
In 1993, a young Tajik woman named Mira returns to her hometown Dushanbe after living in Russia in the early years immediately after the collapse of the Soviet Union. She learns shortly after arriving that her father has gambled her away to an old man, Ibrohim, who is eagerly claiming his prize. Mira goes into hiding while the Tajik Civil War rages outside. She meets and falls in love with Daler, the local cable car driver.

Filming location
The film was shot in the Tajikistan capital Dushanbe, and is overshadowed by the gunfire of the civil war that broke out during the shooting.

Cast
Daler Madjidav as Daler
Paulina Galvez as Mira
Alisher Kasimov as Farhad
Bokhodur Djurabajev as Mira's father
Radzhab Khuseynov as Ibrohim

Awards
Venice Film Festival 1993: Silver Lion (Best Director)

External links
Pandora Film company

References

1993 films
Tajik-language films
Tajikistani drama films
Japanese drama films
Russian drama films
Swiss drama films
German drama films
1993 drama films
Fictional Tajikistani people
Films directed by Bakhtyar Khudojnazarov
1990s Japanese films
1990s German films